Halabcheh Camp ( – Ardūgāh Ḩalabcheh) is a camp in Gowdin Rural District, in the Central District of Kangavar County, Kermanshah Province, Iran. At the 2006 census, its population was 116, in 22 families.

References 

Populated places in Kangavar County